Hajiabad-e Fajr is a village in Cheshmeh Ziarat Rural District, in the Nosratabad of Zahedan County, Sistan and Baluchestan Province, Iran. At the 2006 census, its population was 179, in 36 families.

References 

Populated places in Zahedan County